Girida sporadica is a moth in the family Geometridae. It is found in eastern Africa, where it has been recorded from Ethiopia, Kenya, Rwanda, Uganda, Zimbabwe and Madagascar.

References

Moths described in 1932
Eupitheciini